Eigencolloid is a term derived from the German language (eigen: own) and used to designate colloids made of pure phases. Most often such colloids are formed by the  hydrolysis of heavy metals cations or radionuclides, such as, e.g., Tc(OH)4, Th(OH)4, U(OH)4, Pu(OH)4, or Am(OH)3. Colloids have been suspected for the long-range transport of plutonium on the Nevada Test Site.

See also
 Cations hydrolysis
 Colloid-facilitated transport

References
 

 

 Breynaert E. (2008). PhD Thesis. Catholic University of Leuven. Formation, stability and applications of eigencolloids of technetium.
 

 

Actinides
Colloids
Colloidal chemistry